Aamer Sajjad (born 5 February 1981) is a Pakistani former first-class cricketer. A right-handed batsman and right-arm off-spin bowler, he played first-class cricket from 2002 to 2018.

In 2009–10 he scored more runs than anybody else in the Pakistan season, finishing with 1435 runs at an average of 68.33. Opening the batting for Water and Power Development Authority against Sui Southern Gas Company, he made 289, adding 580 for the second wicket with Rafatullah Mohmand. It is the highest second-wicket partnership, and the second-highest partnership of all, in first-class cricket history.

He was selected for the Pakistan A tours of Sri Lanka in August and September 2010, and the West Indies in November. When the regular captain, Rana Naved-ul-Hasan, was absent, he often captained the Water and Power Development Authority team. In February 2021, he began to undertake coaching courses with the Pakistan Cricket Board.

References

External links
 Aamer Sajjad at CricketArchive
 

1981 births
Living people
Cricketers from Lahore
Pakistani cricketers
Lahore cricketers
Water and Power Development Authority cricketers